Neblett is a family name, and may refer to:
 A. Viola Neblett (1842-1897), American temperance activist, suffragist, and women's rights pioneer
 Andre Neblett (born 1988), American football player
 Colin Neblett (1875–1950), American judge
 Edward Neblett (born 1964), Barbadian boxer
 James Neblett (1901–1959), West Indian cricketer
 Touré (born 1971), born Touré Neblett, American author

See also
 Niblett, a surname